The 1920 All-Western college football team consists of American football players selected to the All-Western teams chosen by various selectors for the 1920 college football season.

All-Western selections

Ends
 Chuck Carney, Illinois (MK, MM, RG, CT) (CFHOF)
 Frank Weston, Wisconsin (FM, MK, RG, CT-1)
 Lester Belding, Iowa (FM, MM, CT-2)
 Franklin Cappon, Michigan (CT-2)

Tackles
 Frank Coughlin, Notre Dame (MK, MM, CT-1)
 Iolas Huffman, Ohio State (FM [guard])
 Tad Wieman, Michigan (FM)
 Angus Goetz, Michigan (MM)
 Duke Slater, Iowa (RG, CT-2) (CFHOF)
 Tillie Voss, Detroit (RG, CT-1)

Guards
 Charles McGuire, Chicago (FM [tackle], MK [end], MM, CT-2 [tackle])
 William G. McCaw, Indiana (FM, MK)
 Graham Penfield, Northwestern (RG, CT-1)
 George C. Bunge, Wisconsin (RG)
 Maurice J. "Clipper" Smith, Notre Dame (MK, CT-2)
 Tierney, Minnesota (CT-1)
 Smith, Notre Dame (CT-2)

Centers
 Jack Depler, Illinois (FM, MK, MM [guard], RG, CT-2)
 Polly Wallace, Ames (MM, CT-1)

Quarterbacks
 Aubrey Devine, Iowa (MK, MM, RG, CT-1) (CFHOF)
 Robert H. Fletcher, Illinois (FM, CT-2)

Halfbacks
 Gaylord Stinchcomb, Ohio State (FM, MK, MM, CT-1) (CFHOF)
 George Gipp, Notre Dame (FM [fullback], MK, MM, RG, CT-1) (CFHOF)
 Arnold Oss, Minnesota (FM)
 Elliott, Wisconsin (CT-2)
 Steketee, Michigan (CT-2)

Fullbacks
 Jack Crangle, Illinois (MK, RG, CT-1)
 Phil White, Oklahoma (MM, RG [halfback])
 Sundt, Wisconsin (CT-2)

Key

See also
1920 College Football All-America Team
1920 All-Big Ten Conference football team

References

1920 Big Ten Conference football season
All-Western college football teams